The Valley Times is a monthly newspaper in the Scottsdale, Arizona, United States area. It was previously named the Gilbert Times. It has a monthly circulation of 75,000. It is owned by Times Publications, a division of Strickbine Publishing.

References

External links
 

Mass media in Maricopa County, Arizona
Monthly newspapers
Newspapers published in Arizona